GMB may refer to:

Arts and media
 GMB (album), 2012, by hip-hop trio Pac Div
 Good Morning Britain (2014 TV programme)
 Good Morning Britain (1983 TV programme)
 GMB Publishing, UK finance book publisher, 2004–2011, subsumed by Kogan Page

Places

Africa
 The Gambia, by ISO 3166 alpha-3 country code
 Gambela Airport, Ethiopia, by IATA code

Europe
 Gardermoen Line, a high-speed railway
 Graduates Memorial Building, at Trinity College, Dublin, Ireland
 Grimsby Town railway station, England, by GBR code

Other uses
 GMB (trade union), UK
 Grand Bauhinia Medal, Hong Kong honour
 Martin GMB, 1918 US bomber aircraft